Federal Department Store, or Federal's, was a department store chain based in Detroit.

History 
Federal's was founded in 1929. In 1961, Federal's merged with Kobacker's of Columbus, Ohio and in 1969, it bought Shifrin-Willens Jewelers. The chain filed for bankruptcy in 1972. That same year, the Federal's stores in Lansing and Kalamazoo were closed. Steven Watstein, also known as Steven West, purchased Federal's in 1978. The chain was liquidated in 1980.

One of Federal's holdings at the time of the bankruptcy was the Hoffritz for Cutlery chain, which was sold off in 1975 in a leveraged buyout.

References

Defunct department stores based in Michigan
Defunct companies based in Michigan
Companies based in Detroit
American companies established in 1929
Retail companies established in 1929
Retail companies disestablished in 1980
1929 establishments in Michigan
1980 disestablishments in Michigan